Arthur Bateman (12 June 1918 – November 1984) was an English footballer who played as a full-back for Crewe Alexandra and Northwich Victoria.

Career
Bateman played for Crewe Alexandra during World War II, and also guested for Port Vale in December 1944. He actually played against Crewe for Vale in a war cup match on 30 December 1944, which Crewe won 2–1 at Gresty Road. He made a further twelve appearances before returning to Crewe. After three appearances in the Third Division North of the Football League for Frank Hill's "Railwaymen" in 1946–47, he moved on to Cheshire County League side Northwich Victoria in 1947.

References

Sportspeople from Newcastle-under-Lyme
English footballers
Association football fullbacks
Crewe Alexandra F.C. players
Port Vale F.C. wartime guest players
Northwich Victoria F.C. players
English Football League players
1918 births
1984 deaths